Sopo FaKaua (born February 23, 1988) is a Samoan footballer who plays as a midfielder.

References 

Living people
1988 births
Samoan footballers
Samoa international footballers
2012 OFC Nations Cup players
Association football midfielders